Cristian is the Romanian and Spanish form of the male given name Christian. In Romanian, it is also a surname.

Cristian may refer to:

People
 Cristian (footballer, born 1994), Brazilian footballer
 Cristian Adomniței (born 1975), Romanian engineer and politician
 Cristian Agnelli (born 1985), Italian footballer 
 Cristian Alberdi (born 1980), Spanish footballer 
 Cristian Albu (born 1993), Romanian footballer 
 Cristian Alessandrini (born 1985), Argentine footballer
 Cristian Alex (born 1993), Brazilian footballer
 Cristian Alexanda, Australian R&B singer
 Cristian Amarilla (born 1993), Argentine footballer 
 Cristian Amigo (born 1963), American composer, guitarist, and sound designer
 Cristian Andreoni (born 1992), Italian footballer
 Cristian Andrés Campozano (born 1985), Argentine footballer
 Cristian Ansaldi (born 1986), Argentine footballer 
 Cristián Arriagada (born 1981), Chilean actor
 Cristian Avram (born 1994), Moldovan footballer
 Cristian Baroni (born 1983), Brazilian football (soccer) player
 Cristian Berdeja (born 1981), Mexican race walker
 Cristian Bucchi (born 1977), Italian football (soccer) player
 Cristian Bușoi (born 1978), Romanian physician and politician
 Cristian S. Calude (born 1952), New Zealand-Romanian mathematician and computer scientist
 Cristian Castro (born 1974), Mexican pop singer who sometimes records as "Cristian"
 Cristian Chivu (born 1980), Romanian football (soccer) player
 Cristian Daniel Ledesma (born 1982), Italian football (soccer) player
 Cristián de la Fuente (born 1974), Chilean film actor
 Cristian Dumitrescu (born 1955), Romanian politician
 Cristian García Ramos (born 1981), Spanish football (soccer) player known as Cristian
 Cristian Gérard Alvaro Gonzáles, Indonesian football (soccer) player 
 Cristian Guzmán (born 1978), Dominican professional baseball player
 Cristian Molinaro (born 1983), Italian football (soccer) player
 Cristian Muñoz (racewalker) (born 1981), Chilean race walker 
 Cristian Nemescu (1979–2006), Romanian film director
 Cristian Pache (born 1998), Dominican professional baseball outfielder 
 Cristian Panait (1973–2002), Romanian prosecutor
 Cristian Popescu (1959–1995), Romanian poet
 Cristian Riveros (born 1982), Paraguayan football (soccer) player
 Cristian Rodríguez (boxer) (born 1973), Argentine boxer
 Cristian Terheș (born 1978), Romanian politician
 Cristián Undurraga (born 1954), Chilean architect
 Cristian Volpato (born 2003), Australian-Italian footballer
 Flaviu Cristian (1951-1999), Romanian-American computer scientist

Places in Romania
 Cristian, Brașov
 Cristian, Sibiu

Other
 Cristian's algorithm

See also 
 Christian (given name)
 Christian (surname)
 Cristiano (given name)
 Cristiano (surname)
 Chris (given name)
 Cristina (disambiguation)
 Christina (disambiguation)
 Christine (disambiguation)
 Cristiana (disambiguation)
 Christiana (disambiguation)
 Christiania (disambiguation)
 Christy (disambiguation)
 Christie (disambiguation)
 Cristi (name)
 Cristea (surname)
 Kristian (name)
 Kristina (disambiguation)

Romanian masculine given names
Romanian-language surnames
Spanish masculine given names